Francisco Quiroz (June 4, 1957 – May 15, 1993) was a Dominican professional boxer and WBA world Light Flyweight champion. He was born in Moca, Dominican Republic.

Professional career 
Quiroz became a professional boxer in 1978 and captured the WBA light flyweight title with a KO win over Lupe Madera in 1984. He defended the belt once before losing to Joey Olivo in 1985. After the loss, Quiroz fought periodically in Latin America before retiring in 1990 after five consecutive losses, becoming one of the few world champions to retire with a losing record. His record was 11-15-1 with 5 wins by knockout.

Death 
Quiroz was killed in a nightclub brawl in 1993.

Professional boxing record

See also 

 List of WBA world champions

External links 
 
A Real Tower of Power

1957 births
World Boxing Association champions
World boxing champions
1993 deaths
Dominican Republic male boxers
Light-flyweight boxers